Justicia takhinensis is a species of plant in the family Acanthaceae. It is endemic to Yemen.  Its natural habitat is subtropical or tropical dry shrubland.

References

Endemic flora of Socotra
takhinensis
Endangered plants
Taxonomy articles created by Polbot